Jerry Cameron is a retired American soccer midfielder who played professionally in the Major Indoor Soccer League.

Cameron, a graduate of Ballard High School played three games for the Phoenix Inferno of the Major Indoor Soccer League during the 1981-1982 season.  In 1984, Cameron played for F.C. Seattle in the F.C. Seattle Challenge Series.

References

External links

 MISL stats

Living people
American soccer players
Major Indoor Soccer League (1978–1992) players
Seattle Storm (soccer) players
Phoenix Inferno players
1962 births

Association football midfielders